Following are the results of the Singles events of the 2010 American Express – TED open.  The professional tennis tournament played on outdoor hard courts. It was the twenty-fourth edition of the tournament which is part of the 2010 ATP Challenger Tour. It took place in Istanbul, Turkey between 9 and 15 August 2010.

Illya Marchenko was the defending champion but decided not to participate this year.  Adrian Mannarino won the title, defeating Mikhail Kukushkin 6–4, 3–6, 6–3 in the final.

Seeds

Draw

Finals

Top half

Bottom half

References
 Main Draw
 Qualifying Draw

American Express - TED Open - Singles
PTT İstanbul Cup